Zuxuloba may refer to:

 Zuxuloba, Khachmaz, Azerbaijan
 Zuxuloba, Qusar, Azerbaijan